Katharina Tanzer (born 26 Juli 1995) is an Austrian judoka and Austrian state champion -48 kg. She holds the 1st Dan. In 2022 she is part of the A-Team of the national team.

Katharina Tanzer grew up in Gresten in the district of Scheibbs in Lower Austria. She began her judo career at SV Ulmerferld in Lower Austria. With the beginning of her studies she switched to the Club JV Vienna Samurai. Together with her team, she has won the Austrian women's team championships several times and placed in the Golden League several times.

In June 2016, she suffered a cruciate ligament tear at a training camp in Japan.

She fought in the Deutschen 1. BL Frauen for the club TSV Großhadern.

In 2021, Tanzer switched to Judo Leibnitz. Since this club does not participate in the Austrian Damen Judo-Bundesliga, she has been fighting as a guest fighter for JC Wimpassing in the weight class -48 kg since 2021. After winning in 2021, they successfully defended the title in 2022.

References

External links

 
 Website of Judo Leibnitz

1995 births
Living people
Austrian female judoka
Judoka at the 2019 European Games
European Games medalists in judo
European Games bronze medalists for Austria
21st-century Austrian women